Peter Liu Gen-zhu is a Chinese Roman Catholic prelate currently serving as bishop of the Roman Catholic Diocese of Hongdong, China. He is the second bishop ordained with the approval of the Holy See and the Chinese government under the provisional agreement.

Early life 
Liu Gen-zhu was born on 12 October 1966 in Hongdong County, Shanxi Province, China. He completed his studies from Shaanxi Catholic Theological and Philosophical Seminary, Shaanxi, China.

Priesthood 
Liu  and was ordained a priest in 1991. He was appointed vicar general of the Roman Catholic Diocese of Hongdong in June 2010. He has been a member of the 9th Committee of the Patriotic Association of the Chinese Catholic Church. He has also served as  the deputy director of the 7th Patriotic Association of Shanxi Province.

Episcopate 
Liu Gen-zhu was appointed bishop of the Roman Catholic Diocese of Hongdong and received his episcopal ordination on 22 December 2020. He was consecrated by Bishop Paul Meng Ningyou. His ordination took place at the Catholic church in Hongdong County Square. He succeeded Joseph Sun Yuanmo. The diocese had no bishop since 2006.

References 

Living people
1966 births
Bishops appointed by Pope Francis
Bishops in Asia
Bishops of the Catholic Patriotic Association
21st-century Roman Catholic bishops in China
Chinese Roman Catholic bishops